Stanleytown is a small community in Scott County, Virginia, United States, between Mabe and Rye Cove.  the unofficial mayor is Dale Townsend.

Unincorporated communities in Scott County, Virginia
Unincorporated communities in Virginia